Chahar Bid may refer to:
 Chahar Bid-e Sartang, Fars Province
 Chahar Bid, North Khorasan
 Chahar Bid, Razavi Khorasan
 Chahar Bid, Sistan and Baluchestan